Gavin Glenn Christopher Joseph Cecchini  (born December 22, 1993) is an American professional baseball second baseman who is a free agent. He has played in Major League Baseball (MLB) for the New York Mets.

Early life
Cecchini was born in Lake Charles, Louisiana, and attended Alfred M. Barbe High School. Prior to the 2012 MLB draft, Cecchini was regarded by Perfect Game as "good athlete, highest level hitter and outstanding middle infield tools." 

Cecchini initially committed to play college baseball for the LSU Tigers, before switching his commitment to Ole Miss. He was drafted by the Mets in the first round of the 2012 MLB Draft with the 12th overall pick.

Professional career

New York Mets

Cecchini began his professional career in 2012 with the Kingsport Mets of the Appalachian League, batting .246/.311/.330, and then was promoted to Brooklyn Cyclones for five games in which he was hitless to end the season. Baseball America ranked him as the #2 prospect in the Mets system and the Appalachian League's #12 prospect following the 2012 season. He began the 2014 baseball season as a member of the Savannah Sand Gnats of the Class A South Atlantic League, and for three teams in aggregate he batted .247/.328/.378. 

He was promoted to the Major Leagues on September 6, 2016. He made his Major League debut on September 11, striking out in a pinch hit appearance at Turner Field. On September 24, he hit his first career hit, an RBI double. For the season, he batted .208/.253/.273.

Cecchini was designated for assignment on January 28, 2019 following the signing of Justin Wilson. He was outrighted on February 1, 2019 but was invited to spring training.  After recovering from injury, he was assigned to the Binghamton Rumble Ponies. He became a free agent following the 2019 season.

Canberra Cavalry
On November 8, 2019, Cecchini signed with the Canberra Cavalry of the Australian Baseball League. He abruptly quit his contract with the Canberra Cavalry due to concerns about air pollution caused by bushfires.

Arizona Diamondbacks
On January 29, 2020, Cecchini signed a minor league deal with the Arizona Diamondbacks. He was released on May 22, 2020.

Sugar Land Skeeters
In July 2020, Cecchini signed on to play for the Sugar Land Skeeters of the Constellation Energy League (a makeshift 4-team independent league created as a result of the COVID-19 pandemic) for the 2020 season.

Los Angeles Angels
On May 12, 2021, Cecchini signed a minor league contract with the Los Angeles Angels organization. He elected free agency on November 7, 2021.

Personal life
He is the younger brother of Major League infielder Garin Cecchini.

References

Further reading

External links

 

1993 births
Living people
American people of Italian descent
Baseball players from Louisiana
Binghamton Mets players
Binghamton Rumble Ponies players
Brooklyn Cyclones players
Kingsport Mets players
Las Vegas 51s players
Major League Baseball infielders
New York Mets players
Rocket City Trash Pandas players
Salt River Rafters players
Savannah Sand Gnats players
Scottsdale Scorpions players
Sportspeople from Lake Charles, Louisiana
St. Lucie Mets players
Sugar Land Skeeters players
Syracuse Mets players
2017 World Baseball Classic players
American expatriate baseball players in Australia